Magali Rathier (born 2 December 1974, in Firminy) is a French former synchronized swimmer who competed in the 1996 Summer Olympics and in the 2000 Summer Olympics for the women's team, finishing fifth and fourth, respectively.

References

People from Firminy
1974 births
Living people
French synchronized swimmers
Olympic synchronized swimmers of France
Synchronized swimmers at the 1996 Summer Olympics
Synchronized swimmers at the 2000 Summer Olympics
Sportspeople from Loire (department)